The 2011 Copa Venezuela was the 42nd staging of the Copa Venezuela.

Starting on August 31, 2011, the competition concluded on December 7, 2011 with a two leg final, in which AC Mineros won the trophy for the second time with a 2-1 win away and 1-0 win at home over Trujillanos FC.

First round
1st legs played on 31 August, 1, 4 and 14 September 2011.
2nd legs played on 3, 4, 7 and 21 September 2011.
Byes:
Trujillanos FC (2010 Copa Venezuela champion)
Deportivo Táchira FC (2010–11 Venezuelan Primera División champion)

|}

Second round
1st legs played on 5 October 2011.
2nd legs played on 8 and 9 October 2011.

|}

Quarterfinals
1st legs played on 26 October 2011.
2nd legs played on 2 November 2011.

|}

Semifinals
1st legs played on 9 November 2011.
2nd legs played on 13 November 2011.

|}

Final
1st leg played on 30 November 2011.
2nd leg played on 7 December 2011.

|}

AC Mineros qualify to Copa Sudamericana 2012.

External links
Official website of the Venezuelan Football Federation 
Soccerway.com

Copa Venezuela
2011–12 in Venezuelan football
2011 domestic association football cups